The 1984 United States Senate election in South Dakota was held on November 6, 1984. Incumbent Republican Senator Larry Pressler was easily re-elected to a second term.

Democratic primary

Candidates
 George V. Cunningham, former aide to Sen. George McGovern
 Dean L. Sinclair

Results

General election

Results

See also 
 1984 United States Senate elections

References 

1984
South Dakota
United States Senate